Oxford Blue is a variety and brand of blue cheese produced in Burford, Oxfordshire, England in 1995 by French baron Robert Pouget  in the tradition of Stilton cheese (it was produced in a Stilton dairy) but with a creamier consistency especially when the cheese was allowed to mature. It is a soft and creamy cheese that has tangy, aromatic and spicy qualities. By 2013, around five tonnes were produced monthly.

Characteristics
Oxford Blue is prepared using unpasteurised cow's milk and is ripened (aged) for 14 to 16 weeks. Its rind is sticky and wet in texture. The cheese is soft, creamy and moist, has aromatic, tangy and spicy qualities, and has traces of white wine and chocolate in its flavour. It has been described as a "French-style English blue" that can be used "as an alternative" to Stilton cheese", and as similar to Dolcelatte and St Agur cheeses, with a less strong flavour than Roquefort or Stilton.

History
Oxford Blue was created by French baron Robert Pouget in 1995. It was initially produced by Hartington Creamery in Derbyshire until 2009, when the creamery closed, and subsequently in Carmarthenshire, Wales. In 2013, efforts began to start producing Oxford Blue at a new, small dairy in Burford, Oxfordshire, which was developed in a converted barn. At the Burford site in 2013, Pouget encountered an initial problem of having nowhere to dispose of waste whey, a byproduct of the cheese's production, which was at around  each month. The problem was solved by the introduction of an anaerobic digester to process the whey. In April 2013, around five tonnes of Oxford Blue were produced monthly. In 2015 the cheese was distributed by the Oxford Cheese Company.

See also

 List of blue cheeses
 List of British cheeses

References

Blue cheeses
British cheeses